The 2003–04 season was the 55th season in the history of UD Las Palmas and the club's second consecutive season in the second division of Spanish football. In addition to the domestic league, Las Palmas participated in this season's edition of the Copa del Rey.

Transfers

In

Out

Competitions

Overall record

Segunda División

League table

Results summary

Results by round

Matches

Copa del Rey

Statistics

Appearances and goals

References

UD Las Palmas seasons
Las Palmas